Birmingham North was a parliamentary constituency in the city of Birmingham, England.  It returned one Member of Parliament (MP) to the House of Commons of the Parliament of the United Kingdom, elected by the first-past-the-post voting system.

The constituency was created in upon the abolition of the Birmingham constituency in 1885, and was itself abolished for the 1918 general election.

Boundaries
Before 1885 the city of Birmingham, in the county of Warwickshire, had been a three-member constituency (for further details, see Birmingham constituency). Under the Redistribution of Seats Act 1885 the parliamentary borough of Birmingham was split into seven single-member divisions, one of which was Birmingham North. It consisted of the wards of St George's, St Mary's, and St Stephen's.

This division was compact and almost square shaped. It was bounded to the west by Birmingham West, to the north by Handsworth and Aston Manor, to the east by Birmingham East and to the south by Birmingham Central.

In the 1918 redistribution of parliamentary seats, the Representation of the People Act 1918 provided for twelve new Birmingham divisions. The North division was abolished.

Members of Parliament

Elections

Elections in the 1880s

Elections in the 1890s

Elections in the 1900s

Elections in the 1910s

General Election 1914–15:

Another General Election was required to take place before the end of 1915. The political parties had been making preparations for an election to take place and by the July 1914, the following candidates had been selected; 
Unionist: John Middlemore
Liberal: Norman Birkett

See also
List of former United Kingdom Parliament constituencies

References

 Boundaries of Parliamentary Constituencies 1885-1972, compiled and edited by F.W.S. Craig (Parliamentary Reference Publications 1972)

Constituencies of the Parliament of the United Kingdom established in 1885
Constituencies of the Parliament of the United Kingdom disestablished in 1918
Parliamentary constituencies in Birmingham, West Midlands (historic)